

Publications

2020

2021

2022

2023

Notes

References